Puşcaşu may refer to
Puşcaşu, a village in Corcova, Romania
Pușcașu River in Romania
Vasile Pușcașu (born 1956), Romanian wrestler